is a manga series by Takayuki Yamaguchi, based on the first chapter of the novel Suruga-jō Gozen Jiai by Norio Nanjō. An animated television adaptation, based on the first 32 chapters (or the initial six and a half volumes) of the manga.

It aired on WOWOW from July 19 to October 12, 2007. The series was directed by Hiroshi Hamasaki, written by Seishi Minakami, and produced by Madhouse Studios. The series is noted for its realistic graphic violence and nudity as well as its abrupt ending. The anime was licensed in North America by Funimation Entertainment under the fully translated title Shigurui: Death Frenzy. The licensing was announced in May 2008, and the full series was released on March 31, 2009 on Blu-ray and DVD.

Episode List

References

External links
 

Shigurui